The Singapore Armed Forces Good Service Medal is awarded to a regular career soldier of the Singapore Armed Forces (SAF) who has satisfactorily completed 5 years of dedicated service.

The medal may be awarded to NSmen who have served 2 years of National Service Full-time (NSF) and at least 3 high-key In-Camp Training (ICT) served satisfactorily as NSmen. The criteria are based on a reservist's good attitude towards National Service, in-camp training competency performance and meaningful contributions to the SAF.

Description

 The ribbon is orange, with two white stripes.

Service medals
In the SAF, the medals for service are:
  5 years - Singapore Armed Forces Good Service Medal
 10 years - Singapore Armed Forces Long Service and Good Conduct (10 Years) Medal
 15 years - Singapore Armed Forces Long Service and Good Conduct (10 Years) Medal with 15 year clasp
 20 years - Singapore Armed Forces Long Service and Good Conduct (20 Years) Medal
 25 years - Long Service Medal (Military)
 30 years - Singapore Armed Forces Long Service and Good Conduct (20 Years) Medal with 30 year clasp

References
Singapore MINDEF Factsheet: Review of SAF medals
Singaporean Army Medals Factsheet

Military awards and decorations of Singapore